Dead Horse One are a neo-psychedelic/shoegaze band based in Valence, France. The band was founded in 2011 by Olivier Debard, Ludovik Naud, Antoine Pinet (a former member of French band H-Burns ) and Jérôme Simonian. Simonian later departed, and Maxime Garcia and Ivan Tziboulsky joined. The band has performed at the 2013 Liverpool Psych Fest and have shared stages with the Telescopes, the Wands and Sound Sweet Sound.

History 
Following an eponymous, self-released 2012 EP, the band issued the Heavenly Choir of Jet Engines EP on Cranes Records later that year, as well as a split 10" EP with the Dead Mantra.

In 2012, Dead Horse One joined the Dead Bees Records roster and was featured on the label's 11th and 12th sampler compilations. They also appeared on two compilations from Nothing Collective

Dead Horse One's first full-length effort, Without Love We Perish, was produced by Mark Gardener of Ride. It was first issued in March 2014 in CD format by Hands and Moment (Japan) and on vinyl by A Quick One Records (France) On January 22, 2015, it was reissued on vinyl by Les Disques De La Face Cachée/Dead Bees Records.

The band's second album, Season of Mist, was released in February 2017.

Discography

Studio albums 
 Without Love We Perish (2014, Hands and Moment/A Quick One Records; 2015 Les Disques De La Face Cachée/Dead Bees Records)
 Season of Mist (2017, Requiem Pour Un Twister)
 The West Is the Best (2019, Requiem Pour Un Twister)

EPs 
 Dead Horse One EP (2012, self-released)
 Dead Mantra / Dead Horse One split 10" EP with the Dead Mantra (2012, Cranes Records) 
 Heavenly Choir of Jet Engines EP (2012, Cranes Records)

Compilation appearances 
 "Alone" on Dead Bees Records Label Sampler 11 (2012, Dead Bees Records) 
 "Gaze" on Songs from Nøthing #2 (2014, Nøthing Collective)
 "I Love My Man" on Dead Bees Records Label Sampler 12 (2014, Dead Bees Records) 
 "Hopper" on Songs from Nøthing #03 (2015, Nøthing Collective)

References

External links

French alternative rock groups
French indie rock groups
Musical groups established in 2011
Musical groups from Auvergne-Rhône-Alpes
2011 establishments in France